Kenneth R. Council Jr. is a United States Air Force major general who serves as the mobilization assistant to the commander of Air Mobility Command since July 2021. He most recently served as the 14th mobilization assistant to the commander of the United States Transportation Command and commander of the Joint Transportation Reserve Unit from June 7, 2019. Previously, he was the individual mobilization augmentee to the commander of the Eighteenth Air Force from August 2017 to June 2019. Ken is a graduate of Embry-Riddle Aeronautical University.

References

External links
 

Year of birth missing (living people)
Living people
Place of birth missing (living people)
United States Air Force generals